Universiti Malaysia Sarawak (UNIMAS)) is a Malaysian public university, located in Kota Samarahan, Sarawak. UNIMAS was officially incorporated on 24 December 1992. Recently, UNIMAS has been ranked among top 200th in Asian University Rankings 2017 by QS World University Rankings.

The university took in its first students numbering 118 in 1993 with the opening of the Faculty of Social Sciences and Faculty of Resource Science and Technology. These students were temporarily located at Telekom Training College, Simpang Tiga, Kuching until 1994 when the university moved to its East Campus in Kota Samarahan, Sarawak. The university's East Campus at Kota Samarahan was officially launched by the Prime Minister, YAB Dato’ Seri Dr. Mahathir Mohamad on Independence Day, 31 August 1993.

At present, the university consists of 50 Faculties, 3 Institutes and 60 Centres. The Faculty of Language and Communication is the latest faculty formed recently.

UNIMAS was awarded MS ISO 9001: 2008 quality certificate by SIRIM QAS International Sdn. Bhd. and IQNet on 13 May 2010 for its core management process at Undergraduate Studies vision (BPPs) and Centre for Academic Information Services (CAIS).

UNIMAS has implemented and maintains an Information Security Management System (ISMS) which fulfills the requirement of ISO/IEC 27001:2005 and MS ISO/IEC 27001:2007 standards. The scope covers the areas for the management of UNIMAS Data Centre covering equipment, system software, database and operating systems for the university's critical applications. The certification was issued to UNIMAS on 27 September 2013.

An international competition was held for the master plan design of the permanent campus. The winning design for the proposed new university was by Peter Verity (PDRc) the international architect and city planner, who after detailed environmental analysis chose the present site for the West Campus. The objective of the plan was to create an environmentally sustainable urban campus which, in the manner of Louvain-la-Neuve, would form the centre of a significant university new town. The interface between the fresh water and saltwater systems of the site are expected to give the opportunity to create a biodiversity of considerable richness.

The opening of the new West Campus by Prime Minister Datuk Seri Abdullah Haji Ahmad Badawi on 18 April 2006 was witnessed by 10,000 students, staff and members of the public. The event was also broadcast live over RTM1.

University Governance
 Vice-Chancellor - Prof Datuk Dr Mohamad Kadim Suaidi
 Deputy Vice-Chancellor (Academic & International) - Prof Dr Ahmad Hata Rasit
 Deputy Vice-Chancellor (Student Affairs & Alumni) - Prof Dr Haji Kamarudin Kana
 Deputy Vice-Chancellor (Research & Innovation) - Prof Dr Wan Hashim Wan Ibrahim

Niche Areas of development 
UNIMAS commitment to research has already been recognised by the stakeholders and partners in industry by the provision of endowments for the establishment of eight research chairs; these include the Tun Zaidi Chair for Medicinal Chemistry, the Tun Openg Chair for Sago Technology, the Shell Chair for Environmental Studies, and the Sapura Chair for ICT.
Today, UNIMAS’ research is focused on three niche areas of research:

 Biodiversity and Environmental Conservation
 Information Communication and Creative Technology
 Sustainable Community Transformation

Students' Union
The UNIMAS Student Representative Council ( or ) is the student representative body for students at the University Malaysia Sarawak, Malaysia. It is the ultimate legislative body among the students. A general election is held every year to elect representatives to the Student Representative Council.

Rankings

Gallery

See also
 List of forestry universities and colleges
 List of universities in Malaysia

References

External links

 Official Universiti Malaysia Sarawak Website

Universities and colleges in Sarawak
Public universities in Malaysia
Educational institutions established in 1992
1992 establishments in Malaysia